The ARNT gene encodes the aryl hydrocarbon receptor nuclear translocator protein that forms a complex with ligand-bound aryl hydrocarbon receptor (AhR), and is required for receptor function. The encoded protein has also been identified as the beta subunit of a heterodimeric transcription factor, hypoxia-inducible factor 1 (HIF1). A t(1;12)(q21;p13) translocation, which results in a TEL-ARNT fusion protein, is associated with acute myeloblastic leukemia. Three alternatively spliced variants encoding different isoforms have been described for this gene.

The aryl hydrocarbon receptor (AhR) is involved in the induction of several enzymes that participate in xenobiotic metabolism. The ligand-free, cytosolic form of the aryl hydrocarbon receptor is complexed to heat shock protein 90. Binding of ligand, which includes dioxin and polycyclic aromatic hydrocarbons, results in translocation of the ligand-binding subunit only into the nucleus. Induction of enzymes involved in xenobiotic metabolism occurs through binding of the ligand-bound AhR to xenobiotic responsive elements in the promoters of genes for these enzymes.

Interactions 

Aryl hydrocarbon receptor nuclear translocator has been shown to interact with:

 AIP, 
 AHR, 
 EPAS1, 
 HIF1A, 
 NCOA2, 
 SIM1, and
 SIM2.

References

Further reading

External links 
 

Transcription factors
PAS-domain-containing proteins
Oncogenes